Indonesia University of Education (Indonesian: Universitas Pendidikan Indonesia, UPI) was established in 1954 as Teachers Education College (PTPG). It is in Bandung, Indonesia.

Indonesia University of Education is a multi-campus university, with one main campus and several others. The main campus of is at Dr. Setiabudhi Street 229th, Bandung, Indonesia; other campuses are in Cibiru, Tasikmalaya, Sumedang, Purwakarta, and Serang.

The development and improvement of UPI is not only oriented towards the academic field, but also in various fields, including the consolidation of concepts and development plans. Through the assistance of the Islamic Development Bank (IDB), UPI designed and managed the construction of a magnificent, modern and representative campus building to support teaching and learning activities. With the capabilities of the University of Education Indonesia, it is determined to make this educational institution a leading and leading University (a Leading and Outstanding University).

Faculties

Faculty of Education Science (FIP)
The Science of Education Faculty (SoEF/FIP) is led by Prof. Dr. Ahman, M.Pd (Dean). They have the following study programmes:

Education Curriculum and Technology
Educational Administration
Psychology of Guidance and Counselling
Nonformal Education
Special Needs Education
Psychology
Library and Information
Pedagogy: Elementary School Education and Preschool/Early Childhood Education

Social Science Education Faculty (FPIPS)
The Social Science Education Faculty is led by Siti Komariah, M.Si., Ph.D. (Dean). They have the following study programmes:

Education of Civics
Education of History
Education of Geography
Mapping Survey and Geographical Information
Education of Social Science (not to be confused with the other programmes, this programme aims to produce teachers that are competent in teaching Social Science in middle school)
Management of Resort and Leisure
Management of Tourism Marketing
Management of Catering Industry
Basic Study Fields (MKDU) (runs the education of Religion and Belief, Pancasila, Entrepreneurship, Social, Cultural and Technological Environment Education, Sport, Art and Indonesian for all UPI's graduate students)
Education Science of Islam Religion Education
Science of Communication
Education of Sociology

According to the Indonesian education system, Social Science is considered one of the subjects in middle schools (Sekolah Menengah Pertama). The teachers who teach Social Science in these middle schools are supposed to be from the Education of Social Science programme. In high schools, Social Science is divided into four different subjects: Geography, Sociology, History, and Economics. Each subject's teacher is supposed to be from the corresponding program of their respective subject, with the exception of Economics. A number of programmes, including the Education of Economics and the Education of Accounting, are available as part of the Economics and Business Education Faculty (FPEB).

Indonesian high school students may choose one of the three programmes: Science and Mathematics (Matematika dan Ilmu Alam), Social Science (Ilmu-Ilmu Sosial) and Language and Culture Studies (Ilmu Bahasa dan Budaya). While History is available in all programmes, a specialized history subject is available for the Social Science students (they study two subjects of history: General History/Sejarah Wajib and Specialized History/Sejarah Peminatan). Anthropology, in the other hand, is available for the students of Language and Culture Studies. Even so, students from the other programme may choose a maximum of two subjects from the other programme as an 'extra subject' (lintas minat) freely of their interest.

For this reason, the programmes available in all of UPI's faculties are also aimed to handle this 'lintas minat' as well as corresponding to the new curriculum system (which enables this 'lintas minat').

Faculty of Languages and Literature Education (FPBS)
The dean of the Faculty of Languages and Arts Education is Prof. Dr. Didi Suherdi, M. Ed.

List of programmes of Faculty of Languages and Arts Education:
Education of Indonesian
Education of Sundanese
Education of English
Education of Germany
Education of Japanese
Education of Arabic
Education of French
Education of Korean
Studies of Indonesian Language and Literature
Studies of English Language and Literature

Faculty of Art and Design Education (FPSD)
The FPSD was born by separating the art and design programmes from the Faculty of Languages and Literature (FPBS). Their building is at the old building of FPBS.

List of programmes of the Faculty of Art and Design Education:
 Education of Visual Art
 Education of Arts of Music
 Education of Arts of Dance
 Visual Communication of Design
 Film and Television

Faculty of Mathematics and Natural Science Education (FPMIPA) 
The dean of the Faculty of Mathematics and Natural Science Education is Siti Fatimah, M.Si., Ph.D.

List of programmes of the Faculty of Mathematics and Natural Science Education:
Education of Mathematics
Education of Physics
Education of Biology
Education of Chemistry
Mathematics
Physics
Biology
Chemistry
Education of Computer Science
Computer Science
International Program on Science Education

Faculty of Technology and Vocational Skills Education (FPTK)
The dean of the Faculty of Technology and Vocational Skills Education is Dr. Iwa Kuntadi, S.Pd., M.Pd.

List of programmes of the faculty:
Education of Civil Engineering
Education of Building Engineering
Education of Architecture Engineering
Education of Electrical Engineering
Education of Machinery Engineering
Education of Culinary Art
Education of Fashion Art
Education of Family Welfare
Agroindustry Engineering
Electrical Energy Engineering
Electrical Engineering
Civil Engineering
Housing Engineering
Machinery Engineering
Architecture

Faculty of Sports and Health Education (FPOK)
The dean of the Faculty of Sports and Health Education is Prof. Dr. H. Adang Suherman, M.A.

List of programmes of the faculty:
Physical, Health and Recreational Education
Elementary School Sports Teacher Education
Science of Sports
Education of Sports Coaching
Physical Sport Coaching
Nursing (Diploma III)

Faculty of Economics and Business Education (FPEB)
The dean of the Faculty of Economics and Business Education is Dr. Edi Suryadi, M.Si

List of programmes of the faculty:
Education of Economics and Cooperation
Education of Business Management
Education of Office Management
Education of Accountings
Accountings
Management
Science of Islamic Economy and Finance

School of Postgraduate UPI

Vision and mission :

Reflecting on the performance and achievement of the vision in the last five years as outlined in the 2020-2025 SPs UPI Strategic Plan and continuing the successes that have been achieved previously, namely gaining international recognition in the Southeast Asian region in providing postgraduate education, the vision and mission of SPs UPI is formulated as follows.

Obtaining International Recognition in the Implementation of Postgraduate Education in the Field of Education, Discipline Education and Professional Education at the Asian Level in 2025

The intended international recognition is achieved through improving the quality of governance with international standards, increasing the number of international students (in bound and out bound), increasing the quantity and quality of international cooperation, as well as increasing the capacity of lecturers to gain international recognition, and increasing the types/academic programs that receive international recognition. international recognition.

Regional campuses 
 Cibiru Campus, in Bandung Regency 
 Sumedang Campus in Sumedang Regency
 Purwakarta Campus in Purwakarta Regency
 Tasikmalaya Campus in Tasikmalaya
 Serang Campus in Serang, Banten

List of rectors 
 Prof. Dr. Sadarjoen Siswomartojo (1954-1961) (Dean of PTPG Bandung and Dean FKIP Padjadjaran University 1957-1961)
 M.A. Gazali Soerianatasoedjana dan Prof. Drs. Harsojo (1961-1963) Dean of FKIP Unpad A dan B
 Prof. Dr. H. Roeslan Abdulgani (1964-1966) (First Rector of IKIP Bandung)
 Prof. Dr. H. Achmad Sanusi, S.H., M.PA. (1966-1971)
 Prof. Dr. Garnadi Prawirasudirdjo, M.Sc. (1971-1978)
 Prof. Drs. H.M. Nu'man Somantri, M.Sc. (1978-1987)
 Prof. Drs. H. Mas Abdul Kodir, M.Sc. (1987-1995)	
 Prof. Dr. H.M. Fakry Gaffar, M.Ed. (1995-2005) (First Rector while changed into UPI)
 Prof. Dr. H. Sunaryo Kartadinata, M.Pd. (2005-2015)
 Prof. H. Furqon, M.A., Ph.D. (2015–2017) (died while in office)
 Prof. Dr. H. R. Asep Kadarohman, M.Si. (2017–2020) (substitute between time rector 2015-2020)
 Prof. Dr. H. M. Solehuddin, M.Pd., M.A. (2020–present)

References

External links
 UPI Official Website
 Isola Pos Online - Students' Newspaper 
 UPI internet research centre  

Universities in Bandung
Universities in West Java
Educational institutions established in 1954
1954 establishments in Indonesia
Indonesian state universities